Tan Cang Station (Vietnamese: Ga Tân Cảng) is a future elevated Ho Chi Minh City Metro station on Line 1. Located in Binh Thanh District, the station is planned to open in 2024.

References

Railway stations scheduled to open in 2024
Ho Chi Minh City Metro stations